The Fehmarn Sound Bridge  connects the German island of Fehmarn in the Baltic Sea with the German mainland near Großenbrode.

Description
The  crossing includes the  network arch bridge which carries road and rail over the  Fehmarn Sound. Construction began in 1958 and the bridge was opened on April 30, 1963. The two steel arches, from which the central span is suspended by cables, are braced with steel cross-beams. The bridge was designed by engineers G. Fischer, T. Jahnke and P. Stein from the firm Gutehoffnungshütte Sterkrade AG, Oberhausen-Sterkrade. Architect Gerd Lohmer helped with the architectural design.

Route and ferry changes
At the same time as the opening of the bridge, changes were made to ferry services. The previous ferry service to the island of Fehmarn was discontinued. The service from Großenbrode Quay, Germany to Gedser, Denmark, crossing both Fehmarn Sound and the Fehmarn Belt, was replaced with a new service from Puttgarden (on Fehmarn) to Rødby, Denmark crossing just the Fehmarn Belt. The new bridge and ferry changes brought about a substantial time saving for both road and rail traffic along the so-called Vogelfluglinie (literally "bird flight line") from Hamburg to Copenhagen.

Historic monument
The Fehmarn Sound bridge was declared an historic monument in 1999 by the State Office for Protection of Historical Monuments of Schleswig-Holstein in Kiel, and has since become a symbol of both Fehmarn and Schleswig-Holstein.

Cold War explosive charges
As the bridge was built during the Cold War, six explosive vaults were embedded below the approach road on the mainland side to be used in case of invasion. Their location is given away even today by six square asphalt patches.

Future
A Fehmarn Belt Tunnel is under construction between Denmark and Germany, with four lanes (2+2) and double track railway. But according to the agreement between the two countries, the Fehmarn Sound bridge can remain as it is, one lane per direction and a single railway track.

In December 2012 a study was published saying that the bridge could not cope with the increased railway and road traffic expected after the tunnel opening.

In 2020 it was decided to build a four lane, double track railway Fehmarn Sound Tunnel to carry most of the increased traffic. However, the bridge will still remain in place for pedestrians and local road traffic.

References

 Originally published in EISENBAHN-Kurier SPECIAL 53, Freiburg 1997.

See also 
 List of bridges in Germany

External links

 Pictures of the construction and opening of the bridge 
 Video of the construction of the bridge 

Buildings and structures in Schleswig-Holstein
Connections across the Baltic Sea
Bridges completed in 1963
Through arch bridges
Road-rail bridges
Sterkrade
Road bridges in Germany
Network arch bridges
Fehmarn